In enzymology, a serine-glyoxylate transaminase is an enzyme that catalyzes the chemical reaction

L-serine + glyoxylate  3-hydroxypyruvate + glycine

Thus, the two substrates of this enzyme are L-serine and glyoxylate, whereas its two products are 3-hydroxypyruvate and glycine.

This enzyme belongs to the family of transferases, specifically the transaminases, which transfer nitrogenous groups.  The systematic name of this enzyme class is L-serine:glyoxylate aminotransferase. This enzyme participates in glycine, serine and threonine metabolism.  It employs one cofactor, pyridoxal phosphate.

References

 
 
 

EC 2.6.1
Pyridoxal phosphate enzymes
Enzymes of unknown structure